is a Japanese singer and songwriter under UK Sweet label.

Biography
Keiko made her debut with a chorus part in the band B.B.Queens then joined with J-pop female band Mi-Ke from 1991 to 1993, before starting a solo career. As a child, Utoku listened to a lot of music, including music made by Momoe Yamaguchi. She has written and sung many songs, such as "Wasurenagusa", and Sonic the Hedgehog fans remember her for her vocal work in the original version of the Sonic CD video game's opening and closing themes in Japan and Europe, "Sonic – You Can Do Anything" and "Cosmic Eternity – Believe In Yourself" in 1993.

At recent dates, she has released 15 singles, 5 digital singles, 4 studio albums, 1 mini and 2 best albums.

Discography

Albums

Studio albums

Compilation albums

Remix albums

Extended plays

Singles

As lead artist

References

External links 
  Official website

1967 births
Living people
Japanese women singer-songwriters
Being Inc. artists
Musicians from Kagoshima Prefecture
20th-century Japanese women singers
20th-century Japanese singers
21st-century Japanese women singers
21st-century Japanese singers